Angelo Ferrari (14 August 1897 – 15 June 1945) was an Italian actor known for his work in German cinema.

Selected filmography

 The Nude Woman (1922)
 The Green Manuela (1923)
 Samson (1923)
 The Faces of Love (1924)
 Prater (1924)
 The Circus Princess (1925)
 Jealousy (1925)
 The Golden Calf (1925)
 The Motorist Bride (1925)
 The Clever Fox (1926)
 Tea Time in the Ackerstrasse (1926)
 Battle of the Sexes (1926)
 When She Starts, Look Out (1926)
 The Flight in the Night (1926)
 Roses from the South (1926)
 Young Blood (1926)
 Heads Up, Charley (1927)
 Circus Renz (1927)
 My Aunt, Your Aunt (1927)
 Naples is a Song (1927)
 The Transformation of Dr. Bessel (1927)
 Orient Express (1927)
 Folly of Love (1928)
 The Lady and the Chauffeur (1928)
 Odette (1928)
 Pawns of Passion (1928)
 Five Anxious Days (1928)
 The Sinner (1928)
 The Story of a Little Parisian (1928)
 The Duty to Remain Silent (1928)
 The Carousel of Death  (1928)
 Villa Falconieri (1928)
 The Third Confession (1929)
 Distinguishing Features (1929)
 The Youths (1929)
 Revolt in the Batchelor's House (1929)
 Of Life and Death (1930)
 Troika (1930)
 General Babka (1930)
 The Love Express (1931)
 Road to Rio (1931)
 The Theft of the Mona Lisa (1931)
 Queen of the Night (1931)
 Melody of Love (1932)
 The Escape to Nice (1932)
 One Night with You (1932)
 Idylle au Caire (1933)
 Model Wanted (1933)
 Season in Cairo (1933)
 So Ended a Great Love (1934)
 Stradivari (1935)
 City of Anatol (1936)
 The Night With the Emperor (1936)
 Escapade (1936)
 Under Blazing Heavens (1936)
 Love's Awakening (1936)
 Victoria in Dover (1936)
 My Friend Barbara (1937)
 Fridericus (1937)
 Diamonds (1937)
 Tango Notturno (1937)
 Madame Bovary (1937)
 The Man Who Was Sherlock Holmes (1937)
 My Son the Minister (1937)
 Condottieri (1937)
 Such Great Foolishness (1937)
 Togger (1937)
 Fanny Elssler (1937)
 Faded Melody (1938)
 Napoleon Is to Blame for Everything (1938)
 Nanon (1938)
 The Impossible Mister Pitt (1938)
 Comrades at Sea (1938)
 Red Orchids (1938)
 Maria Ilona (1939)
 The Dream of Butterfly (1939)
 Marriage in Small Doses (1939)
 Congo Express (1939)
 Der singende Tor (1939)
 A Man Astray (1940)
 Between Hamburg and Haiti (1940)
 Counterfeiters (1940)
 The Three Codonas (1940)
 Roses in Tyrol (1940)
 The Swedish Nightingale (1941)
 Riding for Germany (1941)
 Goodbye, Franziska (1941)
 Diesel (1942)
 The Thing About Styx (1942)
 Attack on Baku (1942)
 Tonelli (1943)
 Bravo Acrobat! (1943)
 Melody of a Great City (1943)
 A Salzburg Comedy (1943)
 Women Are No Angels (1943)
 A Man Like Maximilian (1945)

Bibliography
 Jung, Uli & Schatzberg, Walter. Beyond Caligari: The Films of Robert Wiene. Berghahn Books, 1999.

External links

1897 births
1954 deaths
Italian male film actors
Italian male silent film actors
Male actors from Rome
20th-century Italian male actors
Italian expatriates in Germany